A number of political movements have involved their members wearing uniforms, typically as a way of showing their identity in marches and demonstrations. The wearing of political uniforms has tended to be associated with radical political beliefs, typically at the far-right or far-left of politics, and can be used to imply a paramilitary type of organization.

Prohibition
A number of countries have legislation banning the wearing of political uniforms. Many also ban members of their police and armed forces from taking part in political activity when in uniform.

In Germany, political uniforms are forbidden.

Political uniforms were forbidden in Sweden during the period 1933-2002. The law existed to prevent Nazi groups from wearing uniforms.

In the United Kingdom, the Public Order Act 1936, passed to control extremist political movements in the 1930s such as the British Union of Fascists, banned the wearing of political uniforms during marches. Attempts to legislate against the wearing of political uniform were difficult to implement, due to problems with defining what constitutes political uniform, but also in determining which groups were a threat to public order. Though this has rarely arisen in recent decades, in January 2015 the Leader of Britain First Paul Golding was convicted for wearing a political uniform. Later in November 2016 the deputy leader of Britain First Jayda Fransen was convicted for wearing a political uniform.

List of parties with political uniforms

Notable uniformed political groups have included:

 The Chinese Communist Party, which dressed its members in green, loose fitting fatigues or the more formal Mao suit
 The Brownshirts, or Sturmabteilung, of the Nazi Party
 The Blackshirts, or Schutzstaffel, of the Nazi Party

"Blackshirts":
 The Blackshirts, Fascist paramilitary groups in Italy
 British Union of Fascists, a fascist political party of the 1930s in the United Kingdom
 The Patriotic People's Movement of Finland
 The Blackshirts, an atheist organisation in India
 Golden Dawn, a neo-Nazi political party in Greece

"Blueshirts":
 The Blueshirts, or Army Comrades Association, an Irish political organisation set up by General Eoin O'Duffy in 1932
 The British Fascists, the first avowedly fascist organisation in the United Kingdom 
 The Chinese Blue Shirt Society, a secret clique within the Kuomintang 
 The National Syndicalists in Portugal
 The Falange Militia in Spain
 The National Unity Party in Canada

"Greenshirts":
 The Green Shirt Movement for Social Credit in the United Kingdom
 The Romanian Iron Guard movement
 The Greenshirts were a wing of the Irish National Corporate Party
 The Hungarian National Socialist Agricultural Labourers' and Workers' Party
 The Brazilian Integralist Action
 The Yugoslav Radical Union

"Redshirts":
 The Redshirts that unified Italy
 The Ratniks, a Bulgarian national-socialist organisation
 The Red Shirts of the Southern United States
 The Red Shirts of Mexico
 The United Front for Democracy Against Dictatorship in Thailand
Other:
 The Gold shirts, a Mexican fascist movement
 The Greyshirts, a South African Nazi organisation
 The Grijze Werfbrigade (Grey Defence Brigade), a Flemish paramilitary organisation of Vlaams Nationaal Verbond, predecessor of the Dietsche Militie that was formed in 1940s
 Silver Legion of America, commonly known as the Silver Shirts, an American fascist organization founded by William Dudley Pelley
 The white uniform of Singapore's People's Action Party

Political uniforms have sometimes taken the form of headwear:
 Red berets were worn as distinguishing devices of the Spanish Carlists 
 Members of the Provisional Irish Republican Army and Sinn Féin have worn black berets in demonstrations, or black balaclavas for anonymity
 Black berets are also worn over hoods by members of ETA
 The Black Panther Party

Other uniformed movements:
 Black Sash a non-violent white women's anti-apartheid organization in South Africa
 Ku Klux Klan in the United States
 Britain First, a far-right group who wear green jackets and flat caps
 Fruit of Islam, the paramilitary wing of the Nation of Islam.
 Yellow vests movement, a populist political movement that began in France in 2018.

The youth sections of some political movements have also been uniformed:
 Hitler Youth (the youth wing of the German Nazi Party)
 Gioventù Italiana del Littorio, youth organization of the Italian National Fascist Party
 Komsomol, youth organization in the Soviet Union
 Free German Youth (German Democratic Republic)

See also
 Armband
 The Black Shorts, a parody of fascist uniforms in the Jeeves novels of P. G. Wodehouse.
 Political colour
 Political symbol
 Black bloc

References

Uniform
Uniforms